Zülfü is a Turkish given name for males. Notable people with the name include:

 Zulfu Adigozalov (1898–1963), Azerbaijani folk singer
 Zülfü Livaneli (born 1946), Turkish musician, author, poet, and politician

Turkish masculine given names